Solti is a Hungarian surname; notable people with this name include:
 Sir Georg Solti (1912–1997), Hungarian-British conductor
 Lady Solti (Valerie Pitts), widow of Sir Georg Solti
 Krisztina Solti (born 1968), Hungarian high jumper

See also
 Ingar Solty (born 1979), German political writer and journalist
Soltis
Soltys (disambiguation)

Hungarian-language surnames